Ivan Hrušovský (23 February 1927 – 5 October 2001) was a Slovak composer and educator.

Hrušovský was born in Bratislava, Slovakia (Czechoslovakia at the time). There, he studied musicology, philosophy, and aesthetics at Comenius University (1947 – 1952). He also studied composition at the Bratislava Conservatory (1947 – 1952) and the Academy of Performing Arts in Bratislava (1952 – 1957), at both institutions with Alexander Moyzes.

Hrušovský wrote a broad variety of musical compositions. He also wrote scientific articles about Slovak music and music education.

External links 
 Hrušovský's piano concerto 
 Hrušovský's 
 https://web.archive.org/web/20070928163305/http://www.sbmp.com/WebPagesTwo/IvanHrusovskybio.html
 List of Hrušovský's works on Music Centre Slovakia: http://hc.sk/src/osobnost.php?lg=en&oid=29&show=diela

1927 births
2001 deaths
Musicians from Bratislava
Slovak composers
Male composers
Slovak male musicians